Alexander Tschirch (17 October 1856 – 2 December 1939) was a German-Swiss pharmacist born in Guben.

He received pharmacy training in Dresden and at the Berner Staatsapotheke (Bern state apothecary). From 1878 to 1880 he studied at the University of Berlin, earning his PhD at Freiburg in 1881, followed by a degree in botany from Berlin in 1884. In 1889–90 he took a study tour of India, Ceylon and Java. From 1890 to 1932 he was a professor of pharmacy and pharmacognosy at the University of Bern, serving as rector in 1908–09.

Tschirch is known for his studies in plant anatomy and for his research of resins and anthraquinone glycosides. He made significant contributions towards the fourth and fifth editions of the Pharmacopoeia Helvetica. He was the author of twenty books and numerous journal articles — among his written works is "Die Harze und die Harzbehälter mit Einschluss der Milchsäfte", a highly regarded reference book on resins and other plant extracts.

Written works 

 Untersuchungen über das Chlorophyll (1884) – Investigations of chlorophyll.
 Grundlagen der Pharmakognosie (with Friedrich August Flückiger, Berlin 1885) – Fundamentals of pharmacognosy.
 Angewandte Pflanzenanatomie (Vienna and Leipzig 1889) – Applied plant anatomy.
 Untersuchungen über die Sekrete (1890 to 1899) – Investigations of secretions.
 Indische Heil- und Nutzpflanzen (1892) – Indian medicinal and useful plants.
 Das Kupfer, vom Standpunkte der gerichtl. Chemie, Toxikologie und Hygiene (Stuttgart 1893) -- Copper, from the standpoint of chemistry, toxicology and hygiene. Digital edition by the University and State Library Düsseldorf
 Anatomischer Atlas der Pharmakognosie (with Otto Österle, 1893) – Anatomical atlas of pharmacognosy.
 Beziehungen des Chlorophylls zum Blutfarbstoff (1896) – Relationships of chlorophyll to hemoglobin.
 Versuch einer Theorie der organischen Abführmittel, welche Oxymethylanthrachinone enthalten (1898) – Theory of organic laxatives which contain oxymethylanthrachinone.
 Die Harze (1899) –- Resins.
 Anatomischer Atlas der Pharmakognosie und Nahrungsmittelkunde: (with 81 tables- Leipzig: Tauchnitz, 1900). – Anatomical atlas of pharmacognosy and "food science". Digital edition by the University and State Library Düsseldorf
 Die Harze und die Harzbehälter mit Einschluss der Milchsäfte (second edition, 1906)
 Handbuch der Pharmakognosie. (volume 1–[4]. Leipzig, Tauchnitz 1909-1927) – Textbook of Pharmacognosy.
 Terminologie und Systematik im pharmakochemischen Systeme der Drogen, speziell in der Kohlehydrat-o gruppe ([S.l.] 1911) Digital edition by the University and State Library Düsseldorf
 Les Problèmes modernes de la Pharmacognosie ([S.l.] 1911) Digital edition by the University and State Library Düsseldorf
 Erlebtes und Erstrebtes: Lebenserinnerungen. (Bonn, 1921) – memoirs.

References 
 Historisches Lexikon der Schweiz (biography)
 Four items in the list of publications are copied from an equivalent article at the German Wikipedia.

Further reading 

Academic staff of the University of Bern
Humboldt University of Berlin alumni
University of Freiburg alumni
1856 births
1939 deaths
German pharmacists
People from Guben
University of Bern alumni